Charles Edwin Winter (September 13, 1870April 22, 1948) was an American attorney, politician, and author who served as a member of the United States House of Representatives for Wyoming's at-large congressional district from 1923 to 1929.

Early life and education 
Born in Muscatine, Iowa, he attended public schools and Iowa Wesleyan College in Mount Pleasant. He graduated from the Nebraska Wesleyan University in 1892, studied law, and was admitted to the bar in 1895.

Career 
Winter began his legal career in Omaha, Nebraska. He moved to Encampment, Wyoming, in 1902 and to Casper in 1903. He was a delegate to the Republican National Convention in 1908 and was a judge of the sixth judicial district of Wyoming from 1913 to 1919. He resigned from the bench and resumed the practice of law at Casper.

Winter was elected as a Republican to the Sixty-eighth, Sixty-ninth, and Seventieth Congresses, serving from March 4, 1923 to March 3, 1929; he was not a candidate for renomination in 1928, but was an unsuccessful candidate for election to the U.S. Senate. He was attorney general of Puerto Rico in 1932 and 1933, and served as acting governor. He later resumed the practice of law in Wyoming and died in Casper in 1948.
 
During the summer of 1903, while traveling on a train in Pennsylvania, Winter wrote the lyrics to "Wyoming", the official state song. His western novels included Grandon of Sierra, about a cowboy who gives up ranging to be a prospector in the Encampment copper rush, and Ben Warman, which was adapted into the 1920 film Dangerous Love. Gold of Freedom was set in Wyoming's South Pass.

References

External links

 

1870 births
1948 deaths
People from Muscatine, Iowa
Wyoming state court judges
Republican Party members of the United States House of Representatives from Wyoming
American Western (genre) novelists